The 2014–15 División de Honor was the 48th season of the top flight of the Spanish domestic rugby union competition since its inception in 1953. Regular season began on 13 September 2014 and finished on 3 May 2015.

The playoffs began on 17 May finishing with the Final taking place on 31 May.

Valladolid were the defending champions and won their sixth title after defeating UE Santboiana 19–8 in the Final.

Competition format
The regular season runs through 22 match days. Upon completion the regular season, it is the turn of championship playoffs. The breakdown is as follows;
Teams in 1st & 2nd at regular season standings receive a bye to semifinal.
Teams at 3rd, 4th, 5th & 6th position plays for the two vacant places in quarter-finals.
Team in 11th position plays the relegation playoff.
Team in 12th position is relegated.

Each win means 4 points to winning team.
A draw means 2 points for each team.
1 bonus point for a team that achieves 4 tries in a match.
A defeat by 7 or less points means 1 bonus point for defeated team.

Teams

Results

Table

Championship playoffs

Bracket

Quarter-finals

Semifinals

Final

Relegation playoff
The relegation playoff was contested over two legs by FC Barcelona, who finished 11th in División de Honor, and their neighbours Sant Cugat, the losing team from División de Honor B promotion playoff final. Barcelona won the tie, winning 39-26 on aggregate.

1st leg

2nd leg

FC Barcelona won 39–26 on aggregate and remained in División de Honor for 2015–16 season.

Scorers statistics

Top try scorers

Top points scorers

See also
2014–15 División de Honor B de Rugby

References

External links
Official site

2014–15
 
Spain